Pruefer  or Prüfer is a surname of German derivation, and may refer to:
 Heinz Prüfer, German Jewish mathematician (1896-1934)
 Kevin Prufer, American poet (1969)
 Gustav Franz Pruefer, American Music instrument inventor (1861-1951)

See also 

 Prüffer

German-language surnames
 Jewish surnames